Elžbieta Kropa (born 31 March 1999) is a Lithuanian figure skater. She is the 2017 Kaunas Ice Autumn Cup champion and the 2017 Lithuanian national champion. She qualified to the final segment at the 2018 European Championships in Moscow, Russia, and finished 22nd overall. She also represented Lithuania at the 2018 World Championships in Milan, Italy.

Programs

Competitive highlights 
CS: Challenger Series; JGP: Junior Grand Prix

References

External links 

 

1999 births
Lithuanian female single skaters
Living people
Sportspeople from Vilnius
Competitors at the 2019 Winter Universiade